Grant Thomas Donaldson (born 8 June 1976 in Upper Hutt) is a New Zealand cricketer who played for the Wellington Firebirds.

References

External links

1976 births
Living people
Sportspeople from Upper Hutt
New Zealand cricketers
Wellington cricketers
20th-century New Zealand people